Casagrande is a surname. Notable people with the surname include:

Alan Casagrande de Moura (born 1987), Brazilian footballer
Arthur Casagrande (1902–1981), Austrian-American civil engineer
Caroline Casagrande (born 1976), American politician
Dominique Casagrande (born 1971), French footballer
Francesco Casagrande (born 1970), Italian road racing cyclist
Jaime Casagrande (died 2013), Brazilian footballer
Joseph B. Casagrande (1915–1982), American anthropologist
Marco Casagrande (born 1971), Finnish architect
June Casagrande, American writer on grammar and usage
Maurizio Casagrande (born 1961), Italian actor and director
Walter Casagrande (born 1963), Brazilian footballer

Fictional
The following characters from The Loud Houses spinoff, The Casagrandes:
Maria Santiago (née Casagrande), the mother of Ronnie Anne and Bobby
Rosa Casagrande, the mother of Maria and Carlos and grandmother of Ronnie Anne, Bobby, Carlota, CJ, Carl and Carlitos
Hector Casagrande, the father of Maria and Carlos and grandfather of Ronnie Anne, Bobby, Carlota, CJ, Carl and Carlitos
Carlos Casagrande, the brother of Maria and father of Carlota, CJ, Carl and Carlitos
Frida Casagrande, the wife of Carlos
Carlota Casagrande, the daughter of Carlos and Frida, and sister of CJ, Carl and Carlitos
CJ Casagrande, the brother of Carlota, Carl and Carlitos
Carlino Casagrande, the brother of Carlota, CJ and Carlitos
Carlitos Casagrande, the brother of Carlota, CJ and Carl

See also
7356 Casagrande
The Casagrandes, an American animated television series